HM Fort Roughs was one of several World War II installations that were designed by Guy Maunsell and known collectively as His Majesty's Forts or as Maunsell Sea Forts; its purpose was to guard the port of Harwich, Essex, and more broadly, the Thames estuary. This 4,500 ton artificial naval installation is similar in some respects to "fixed" offshore oil platforms. Today it is the location and de facto capital of the unrecognised state of the Principality of Sealand.

History

1942: Construction, positioning, occupation

As a contemporary historical society notes, Fort Roughs or the "Rough Towers" was "the first of originally four naval forts designed by G. Maunsell to protect the Thames Estuary." The artificial sea fort was constructed in dry dock at Red Lion Wharf, Gravesend, in the year preceding and into 1942.

This artificial naval installation is similar in some respects to early "fixed" offshore oil platforms. The twin concrete supporting towers were divided into seven floors, four for crew quarters; the remainder provided dining, operational, and storage areas, e.g., for several generators, and for fresh water tanks and antiaircraft munitions. There was a steel framework at one end supporting a landing jetty and crane which was used to hoist supplies aboard; the wooden landing stage itself became known as a "dolphin".

The towers were joined above the eventual waterline by a steel platform deck upon which other structures could be added; this became a gun deck, on which an upper deck and a central tower unit were constructed. QF 3.7 inch anti-aircraft guns were positioned at each end of this main deck, with a further two Bofors 40 mm anti-aircraft guns and the central tower radar installations atop a central living area that contained a galley, medical, and officers quarters.

The fort was towed from the degaussing station at Tilbury docks by four tugs"Dapper", "Crested Cock", "King Lear" and "Lady Brassey". Although setting off from Tilbury docks on the morning of 9 February 1942, an eventful journey meant that it didn't reach its final destination until 16:00 on 11 February 1942. Its location on Rough Sands, approximately 10 miles off the Harwich seafront, was at the time situated in international waters although the superstructure of the vessel above the waterline remained visible from the coast of England.

HM Fort Roughs was in operation within 30 minutes of being launched: the crew had been aboard during the fitting out in harbour and were well acquainted with the fort's equipment. Approximately 100 men were assigned to the barge before deployment on Rough Sands; thereafter, the fort was occupied by 150–300 Royal Navy personnel, which continued throughout World War II. At the conclusion of hostilities all original personnel were evacuated from HM Fort Roughs.

1956: Removal of full-time HMG personnel 

British government official entities used Roughs Tower for a variety of purposes until 1956 when all full-time personnel were finally removed. Roughs Tower remained identified by name on buoys placed in position by the Ministry of Defence which are maintained under an arrangement with Trinity House. Their purpose is to warn vessels of this obstacle, especially in time of fog because busy shipping lanes criss-cross the area with vessels going to and from the container Port of Felixstowe, Suffolk, and the Port of Harwich, Essex. UK Ordnance Survey now identify the former sea barge fort as Roughs Tower on their charts.

1966: Occupation
In 1966 Paddy Roy Bates, who operated Radio Essex, and Ronan O'Rahilly, who operated Radio Caroline, landed on and occupied Fort Roughs. After disagreements, Bates seized the tower as his own. O'Rahilly attempted to storm the fort in 1967 but Bates thwarted the attack with guns and petrol bombs. As a result the British Royal Marines went to the fort and ordered Bates to surrender and received warning shots fired by Bates' son Michael. The pair were arrested and charged with weapons offences but the court threw the case out as it did not have jurisdiction beyond the territorial waters of Britain. Bates took this as de facto recognition of his country and seven years later issued a constitution, flag, and national anthem, among other things, for the Principality of Sealand (founded on 2 September 1967). In 1978, a German businessman, along with some other Germans and Dutchmen invaded Roughs Tower but Bates recaptured it and finally released them, after a visit by a diplomat from the German embassy in London.

Location
According to the Admiralty chart the fort's location is at 51°53.71′N 1°28.83′E.  The structure is marked by east and west cardinal buoys.  Other references (taken from land-based maps) are Ordnance Survey , and on OpenStreetMap within 200 meters of the chart location .

References

Fort Roughs
Forts in Essex
Roughs
Fort Roughs
Fort Roughs
Fort Roughs
Coastal Essex
Sea forts
World War II sites in England